Star Comics was an imprint of Marvel Comics that began in 1984 and featured titles that were aimed at child readers and were often adaptations of children's television series, animated series or toys. The last comic published under the imprint featured a May 1988 cover date, although the Star Comics Magazine continued through December 1988. Some of the titles continued after that, being published directly by Marvel. Several of the original titles consciously emulated the house writing and visual style of then-recently defunct Harvey Comics titles such as Richie Rich.

The imprint's signature titles were Peter Porker, The Spectacular Spider-Ham and Heathcliff, its longest running title. The imprint was also known for its Star Wars titles, Droids and Ewoks (based on the animated television series). Artists working on the line include Warren Kremer and Howard Post.

Background
For a number of years the industry had benefited from an "age stepladder" whereby comics readers could ascend naturally from children's titles by Gold Key Comics (Disney and Looney Tunes licensee) and Harvey, upward to the Archie Comics titles for preteens, and finally graduating to the Marvel and DC titles for teens and older readers or to independent comics. When Gold Key and other children's comic publishers went out of business, both Marvel and DC began exploring ways to fill that missing step on the reading ladder. In 1983, Gold Key ended its licensed kids' lines.

Marvel had never published a successful children's line, although prior to the existence of the Star imprint, they had released a few miniseries based on licensed toy and cartoon properties, such as Rom The Spaceknight, The Smurfs, and Starriors. In 1977 Marvel also published several licensed Hanna-Barbera titles including Dynomutt, The Flintstones, Scooby-Doo, Yogi Bear, and Laff-a-Lympics. In a one shot, Marvel Tails No. 1, published in 1983 under the Marvel imprint, Spider-Ham debuted.

By the early 1980s, Marvel Comics was in negotiations with Harvey Comics to assume publication of some of their characters. Harvey editor Sid Jacobson, along with the other Harvey staff, were interviewed by Mike Hobson, Marvel's group vice-president of publishing (de facto publisher). As part of the process, Jacobson created several new characters which were well received by Hobson and effectively sealed the deal. Marvel Editor-in-Chief Jim Shooter appointed editor Tom DeFalco as Executive Editor to coordinate with the Harvey staff, who were hired by Marvel. On the day Marvel was set to take over the Harvey publications, Harvey Comics pulled out of the deal due to an internal disagreement among the Harvey brothers. Harvey would cease publishing their comics in 1982. With the loss of the Harvey characters, the Marvel staff reevaluated their publishing plan and decided that their new line of all-age comics would be published under a different imprint name.

History

Star Comics was the name selected early on in the revamp of the publishing plan. The first comic published was the first issue of a three issue movie adaptation, The Muppets Take Manhattan, in July 1984 with a stand date of November 1984. After the Star line was launched, several of their existing, ongoing titles which were based on licensed toylines, such as G.I. Joe: A Real American Hero and Transformers, remained under the Marvel banner.

The regular line did not appear on the stands until five months later and were launched over a two-month period with three original and six licensed titles. Fraggle Rock, Heathcliff, Planet Terry and Strawberry Shortcake were released in the first month while The Ewoks, Get Along Gang, Muppet Babies, Royal Roy and Peter Porker, the Spectacular Spider-Ham followed in the second month. Top Dog and Wally the Wizard were also early Star original comic titles.

In late 1985 Harvey Comics sued Star Comics for copyright infringement, claiming that Royal Roy was a blatant copy of Richie Rich. Thus the title was canceled after six issues due to this similarity.

Millie the Model that was started in her own title in 1945, during Marvel's Timely Comics era, and ran until 1973, had a Star Comics spin-off (to add to its earlier spin-offs) in Misty (the Model) mini-series. In Misty, Millie heads her own modeling agency. Marvel Productions' animated series were sourced for Star Comics titles including Defenders of the Earth and "Inhumanoids".

The lines' two Star Wars titles crossed over in Droids #4 and Ewoks #10.

Marvel eventually dissolved the Star imprint, but absorbed several Star titles under the main Marvel banner such as  Silverhawks and continued to license new properties, such as Captain Planet and Police Academy. The Star original characters (Top Dog, Planet Terry, Royal Roy and Wally Wizard) later were used in a Marvel Comics series, such as X-Babies limited series as antagonists in 2009, then Planet Terry was in Drax starting in issue #6 in 2016.

Titles

Original titles
 Misty (six-issue limited series, 1985–1986)
 Peter Porker, The Spectacular Spider-Ham (1985–1987)
 Planet Terry (1985–1986)
 Royal Roy 1–6 (1985–1985)
 Top Dog (1985–1987)
Wally the Wizard (1985–1986)

Licensed titles
 Air Raiders (1987–1988; #1–2 under Star imprint, continued under Marvel imprint)
 Animax (1986–1987)
 ALF
 Bullwinkle and Rocky (1987–1989; #1–2 under Star imprint)
 Care Bears (1985–1989; #1–14 under Star imprint)
 Chuck Norris: Karate Kommandos #1–4 (1987)
 Count Duckula (1988)
 Defenders of the Earth (1987)
 Ewoks (1985–1987)
 The Flintstone Kids (1987–1989; #1–4 under Star imprint)
 Foofur (1987–1988; #1–4 under Star imprint)
 Fraggle Rock (volume 1: 1985–1986 under Star imprint; volume 2:1988 under Marvel)
 The Get-Along Gang (1985–1986)
 Heathcliff (1984–1991; #1–22 under Star imprint)
 Heathcliff's Funhouse (1987–1988; #1–5 under Star imprint)
 Hugga Bunch (1986–1987)
 Inhumanoids (1987)
 Madballs (1986–1988; #1–8 under Star imprint)
 Masters of the Universe (1986–1988)
 Masters of the Universe: The Motion Picture (1987)
 Muppet Babies (1985–1989; #1–17 under Star imprint)
 The Muppets Take Manhattan 1–3 limited series (1984)
 Popples (1986–1987)
 Silverhawks (1987–1988; #1–5 under Star imprint, 6 & 7 under Marvel)
 Star Comics Digest a.k.a. Star Comics Magazine (1986–1988)
 Star Wars: Droids #1–8 (1986–1987) bi-monthly with four issues and issue 5's cover of the series were drawn by John Romita, Sr.
 Strawberry Shortcake (1985–1986)
 ThunderCats (1985–1988; #1–24 under Star imprint)
 Visionaries: Knights of the Magical Light (1987; #1–6)

Additionally, three Star Comics series were planned yet never published:
 Commander USA
 Christy
 Little Wizards
 Young Astronauts

References

External links
 
 

 
Marvel Comics imprints
1984 comics debuts
1988 comics endings
Humor comics